Tehran attack may refer to:

2009 Pakistani Embassy attack in Tehran
2010 attack on Pakistan ambassador to Iran
2011 attack on the British Embassy in Iran
2016 attack on the Saudi diplomatic missions in Iran
2017 Tehran attacks